Walter Eugene McGuire, Jr. (born July 17, 1970) is a former center in the National Football League (NFL).

Career
McGuire was drafted by the New Orleans Saints in 1992 NFL Draft and spent the 1992 NFL season with the team, but did not see any playing time. He spent the 1993 NFL season with the Chicago Bears before spending a year away from the NFL. During the 1995 NFL season he was a member of the Miami Dolphins, but once again did not see any playing time. McGuire spent his final season with the Green Bay Packers, culminating in the victory of Super Bowl XXXI.

He played at the collegiate level at the University of Notre Dame.

References

1970 births
Living people
New Orleans Saints players
Chicago Bears players
Miami Dolphins players
Green Bay Packers players
American football centers
Notre Dame Fighting Irish football players